Shootin 1 is a protein that in humans is encoded by the SHTN1 gene.

References

Further reading